Imre Szellő (born July 27, 1983) is a Hungarian professional boxer who has qualified for the 2008 Olympics.

Career

2007 World Amateur Boxing Championships
At the 2007 World Amateur Boxing Championships in Chicago Szellő missed out on a bronze medal after he was defeated by Russia's Artur Beterbiev in the quarter finals, Beterbiev went on to win the silver medal. However Szellő qualified for the 2008 Olympics by virtue of getting to the quarter finals.

2007 (in Chicago)
Defeated Lennon Bannis (Denmark) - walkover
Defeated Matthew Corbett (Australia) - RSCR2 (10-1)
Lost Artur Beterbiev (Russia) 9-25

2008 Olympics
KO Luis González
Lost to Tony Jeffries 2:10 England

World Series of Boxing record

Professional record

External links
AIBA results for Olympic qualification at World Championships.
Bio

Living people
Light-heavyweight boxers
1983 births
Boxers at the 2008 Summer Olympics
Olympic boxers of Hungary
Hungarian male boxers
People from Cegléd
Sportspeople from Pest County